Kaveri is a 1955 Indian Tamil-language film directed by D. Yoganand, produced by Lena Chettiar and written by A. S. A. Sami. The film stars Sivaji Ganesan, Padmini and Lalitha. It was released in 1955.

This film is shot simultaneously in Telugu as Vijaya Gauri with slightly different cast.

Plot 
A story of two rival kings one of whom (T. E. Krishnamachari) is manipulated by his spiritual Guru (Nambiar). He has a son (Sivaji Ganesan) and this prince tries to stop the designs of the Guru. The prince moves with the people of his Kingdom and fights for their rights. He falls in love with a common girl(Padmini). In the meantime, the daughter (Lalitha) of the rival king (R. Balasubramaniam) also falls in love with the prince. The rival king's advisor (P. S. Veerappa) wants to marry the dancer. After many twists and turns in the story, the designs of the Guru and adviser come to light. The princess sacrifices her love and the prince marries the commoner.

Cast 

Male cast
 Sivaji Ganesan as Vijayan
 Kalaivanar N. S. Krishnan as Manimozhi
 M. N. Nambiar as Gnananandar
 P. S. Veerappa as Senganal 
 D. Balasubramaniam as Nellaiyappar
 R. Balasubramaniam as Vattrivenkar
 E. R. Sahadevan  
 T. E. Krishnamachari as Arulnirai King
 T. K. Sampangi as Minister
 Pullimootai Ramasamy Iyer as Servant
 Kottapuli Jayaraman as Bodyguard
Male Support Cast
 Rajagopal, Shanakaramoorthy, Veerasamy.

Female cast
 Padmini as Kaveri
 Lalitha as Amutha
 T. A. Madhuram as Thangam
 Ragini as Kurathi
 Kusalakumari as Performer
 Maadi Lakshmi as Performer
 Rushyendramani as Maharani
 M. Saroja as Sundari
 Angamuthu as Manimozhi's Mother
Female Support Cast
Rita Dhanam, Thangam, Kumari, Vija, Prada, Saraswathi.

Soundtrack 
The music was composed by G. Ramanathan, Viswanathan–Ramamoorthy and C. S. Jayaraman. Lyrics by Udumalai Narayana Kavi. Playback singers are C. S. Jayaraman, M. L. Vasanthakumari, Jikki, P. Leela & A. G. Rathnamala.

Sindhai Arindhu Vaadi, a song penned by Papanasam Sivan for Sri Valli (1945 film) (partly) and Kaalai Thookki Nindraadum, a kriti by Marimutha Pillai have been used in this film.

Reception 
Kaveri was a box office success, running for 100 days in many centres of the state.

References

External links 
 

1955 films
1950s Tamil-language films
Films scored by Viswanathan–Ramamoorthy
Films scored by G. Ramanathan
Films directed by D. Yoganand
Indian black-and-white films